Patmanjiri is a Janya raga Carnatic music, a musical scale of South Indian classical music.

Janya ragas